Hypseleotris galii, the firetail gudgeon, is a species of gudgeon native to eastern Australia, where it is found in freshwater streams.

Gale's carp-gudgeon is an alternate common name.

References

External links
 Fishes of Australia : Hypseleotris galii

galii
Freshwater fish of Australia
firetail gudgeon